Streisand was Barbra Streisand's Fall 2006 North American concert tour. Comprising 26 shows, it was Streisand's first United States tour since 2000 and her first live concert events since her supposed farewell concerts, Timeless in 2000. The 2006 tour also marked the singer's first time playing in Canadian markets.

In early May 2007 it was announced that Streisand would take the show to Europe. This was her first full length European tour and took place during the months of June and July 2007.

Background
The tour was officially announced on June 12, 2006, after months of speculation. It opened on October 4 in Philadelphia at the Wachovia Center. The tour was presented by promoter Michael Cohl for Concert Productions International and The Next Adventure (A Live Nation Company). Ticket prices for some venues were as much as US$750, and even higher for VIP tickets.

The operatic pop group Il Divo appeared as her special guest; they performed three songs with Streisand as well as their own three song set in the middle of the concert.

The concert tour was one of the most anticipated tours of the year. Ticket sales were very strong with the Toronto show selling out in 30 minutes and 12,000 seats at the Montréal show selling out in the first day on sale.

The October 28 show and the October 30 show in Sunrise, Florida was recorded in high definition for a Showtime television special and confirmed a DVD release on April 28, 2009 as Barbra Streisand: The Concerts which included the 2006 tour filmed at BankAtlantic Center in Sunrise, Florida and the 1994 Concert filmed at Arrowhead Pond of Anaheim in Anaheim, California.

A double album, Live in Concert 2006, was released on May 8, 2007 and contained songs recorded during the New York City, Washington, D.C. and Sunrise concerts.

The show was number seven in the top 10 tours of Billboard's year-end charts for 2006 with a total gross of $76,112,426. The tour went on to gross $$92 million.

In early May 2007, it was announced that Streisand would tour Europe after a 13-year absence. 
"What a joy it will be to perform in so many wonderful countries for the first time," said Streisand. "I can't wait to experience these different audiences and different cultures." A 58 piece orchestra accompanied Streisand as she performed many of the classic songs from her repertoire such as "Evergreen", "People", "The Way We Were" and "Don’t Rain on My Parade".

Ticket fraud
On August 30, 2006, it was announced that more than 1,000 tickets to various dates of Streisand's North American tour were invalidated because they were purchased with stolen credit card information and then put up for sale on various ticket resale sites.

The show

The show was heavy on standards, one of the highlights being a Funny Girl medley. Il Divo performed three songs between acts, as well as songs with Streisand.

The stage was an open platform with four stations of flowers and tea. Streisand entered from the center, rising platform. She wore a black sequin outfit with a slit skirt for the first half of the show and a black gown and shawl with gold trim after the interval. However, beginning at the first New York concert, the second half of the show now featured Streisand wearing a black pant suit. She sat at a tall swivel chair at the front of the stage and at different times during the two and a half hour show moves upstage on a series of walkways through the orchestra.

The tour's opening concert at the Wachovia Center was the highest single event gross in the 10-year history of the arena. The concert grossed $5.4 million from 18,714 paid attendance.

The Columbus Dispatch said of the set up: "The arena had a retro look — configured like a giant nightclub, with long, tiered, lighted runways extending well out into the hall and surrounding a full symphony orchestra. A small table with a vase of flowers was placed front and center, and after Streisand came onstage — lifted via a small elevator smack into the middle of a spotlight — she worked this part of the stage, closest to her adoring audience."

Streisand also held a Q&A session with the audience during the second act.

One of the most talked about parts of the show was a skit where comedic impressionist Steve Bridges playing President George W. Bush uttered such lines as, "I'm concerned about the national debt, so I'm selling Canada", and "If I cared about the polls I would have run for President of Poland." The two end the skit by harmonizing on the "Get Happy/Happy Days Are Here Again"" duet that Streisand and Judy Garland once did together. 

At the October 9 New York show, this skit drew some jeers from the audience, who appeared to be impatient with the political satire. Streisand shot back, "Why don't you shut the fuck up. If you can't take a joke, why don't you leave and get your money back." The assertive response, which she later apologized for by saying, "I'm sorry. I shouldn't have lost it", got the audience back on her side. Bridges did not appear at the November 7, 2006 show at Chicago's United Center due to a previously scheduled Election Night engagement.

Europe
For the European tour a number of changes were made. The group Il Divo were replaced by a group of four Broadway singers, Sean McDermott, Michael Arden, Peter Lockyer, and Hugh Panaro, who performed a different selection of songs. The Steve Bridges segment was dropped for the European Audience.
A few changes were made to the set list, with "Carefully Taught" and "Children Will Listen" being replaced by Papa Can You hear Me? taken from the film Yentl. Another addition was "You Don't Bring Me Flowers".

Commercial reception
The North American tour was a huge success. The 20 concerts grossed $92,457,062 and set house gross records in 14 of the 16 arenas played on the tour.

In Europe the tour faced controversy when the first show set in Rome's Stadio Flaminio was struggling to sell top-priced tickets and citizens calling Streisand to cancel the show after outrageous prices became known. The show in Nice, France at Stade Charles Ehrmann also was cancelled after few weeks of being on sale, the promoter not giving any real reason for the cancellation. In Stockholm, Sweden the show at Globen arena for July 4 was cancelled after Streisand's doctor advised her not to go on stage but rather rest her voice continued the rumors of lacking ticket sales again. 
The tour also gathered more positive news in Berlin, where Streisand performed at the Waldbühne Amphitheater to a crowd of over 17,000. In Paris she was honoured with a medal of the Legion of Honour by President Nicolas Sarkozy.

Set list
The following set list is obtained from the November 20, 2006 show in Los Angeles. It's not intended to represent all dates throughout the show.

"Funny Girl Overture" 
"Starting Here, Starting Now"
"Down with Love"
"The Way We Were"
"Ma Premiere Chanson"
"Evergreen" (with Il Divo)
"Unchained Melody" / "Un-Break My Heart" / "My Way" (Il Divo interlude)
"Come Rain or Come Shine"
"Funny Girl"
"The Music That Makes Me Dance"
"My Man"
"People"
Intermission 
"The Music of the Night" (with Il Divo)
"Carefully Taught" / "Children Will Listen"
"Unusual Way"
"What Are You Doing the Rest of Your Life?"
"Woman In The Moon"
"(Have I Stayed) Too Long at the Fair?"
"A Cockeyed Optimist"
"Somewhere (with Il Divo)
"My Shining Hour
Encore
Don't Rain on My Parade 
Happy Days Are Here Again
Smile

Tour dates

Box office score data

Cancelled shows

DVD

Streisand released a box set called Barbra Streisand: The Concerts which includes the 2006 concert in Florida, the 1994 Live at Arrowhead Pond in Anaheim (on DVD for the first time) and the TV special about The Broadway Album: Putting It Together: The Making of the Broadway Album.

In 2009, this box-set was released in Europe (Region 2) on March 16 and in America (Region 1) on April 28.

Television special
Streisand: Live in Concert, filmed at the featured Florida stop, aired on April 25, 2009, over CBS. The show was watched by 4.98 million viewers.

External links
 Official tour website
 BarbraNews.com
 Barbra Streisand Archives
 The Barbra Streisand Music Guide
 Simply Streisand: A Celebration of Greatness

References

Barbra Streisand concert tours
2006 concert tours
2007 concert tours